This is the complete order of battle for the Battle of Crete and related operations in 1941.

Allied

Land forces

Commonwealth & Allied Forces, Crete - "Creforce"
Headquarters Creforce - (Eastern Zone, east of Chania)
Major-General Bernard Freyberg, VC, Colonel Stewart

 C Squadron, 3rd The King's Own Hussars (seven light tanks)
Major G.W.Peck
10 Light Tank Mk VIs
 B Squadron, 7th Royal Tank Regiment
Lieutenant George Simpson
Two Matilda tanks, crewed in part by two officers and five gunners of the 2/3rd Field Regiment, Royal Australian Artillery (RAA).
 1st Battalion, The Welch Regiment
Lieutenant Colonel A. Duncan, MC (Force Reserve)

2nd New Zealand Division 
Headquarters New Zealand Division - Brigadier, Acting Major General Edward Puttick - (Western Zone, west of Chania)
 27th New Zealand Machine Gun Battalion (Lt. Col. FJ Gwilliam) (179  personnel)
 5th New Zealand Field Artillery Regiment (less infantry detachment) (256  personnel)
 4th New Zealand Infantry Brigade (Brig. Lindsay Inglis) between Chania and Galatas
 18th New Zealand Infantry Battalion (677 personnel)
 19th New Zealand Infantry Battalion (565 personnel)
 20th New Zealand Infantry Battalion (637 personnel)
 1st Light Troop, RA (87 personnel)
 5th New Zealand Infantry Brigade (Brig. James Hargest) (Maleme and Platanias)
 21st New Zealand Infantry Battalion (376 personnel)
 22nd New Zealand Infantry Battalion (644 personnel)
 23rd New Zealand Infantry Battalion (571 personnel)
 28th (Maori) Infantry Battalion (619 personnel)
 7th Field Company New Zealand Engineers (148 personnel)
 19th Army Field Corps Company (216 personnel)
 New Zealand Field Punishment Centre (FPC) Prisoners were released to fight the enemy.
 1st Greek Regiment (1,030  personnel), (Col. IP Papadimitropoulos)
 Evelpidon Officers' Academy (17 Officers, 300 Cadets), (Lt. Col. Loukas Kitsos)
 10th New Zealand Infantry Brigade (Lt. Col. Howard Kippenberger) (Galatas)
 New Zealand Divisional Cavalry (194 personnel)
 New Zealand Composite Battalion (1007 personnel)
 6th Greek Regiment (Lt. Col. M Grigoriou)(1485 personnel)
 8th Greek Regiment (Lt. Col. Pan Karkoulas)(1013 personnel)

British 14th Infantry Brigade 
 Headquarters, 14 Bde (Brig. Brian Herbert Chappel) – at Heraklion
 2nd Battalion, Leicestershire Regiment (Lt. Col. CHV Cox, DSO, MC) (637 personnel)
 2nd Battalion, York and Lancaster Regiment (Lt. Col. A Gilroy) (742 personnel)
 2nd Battalion, Black Watch (Major AA Pitcairn, temporary commander) (867 personnel)
 1st Battalion, Argyll and Sutherland Highlanders (Lt. Col. RCB Anderson, DSO, MC) (655 personnel) – Tymbaki sector
 7th Medium Regiment, RA (Maj. R.J.B. Snook, DSO (wounded - 20 May 1941). No artillery weaponsa; equipped and served at Crete as infantry. (450 personnel)
Attached to 14 Bde:
 Australian 2/4th Battalion (Lt. Col. Ivan Dougherty) (550 personnel)
 Greek 3rd Regiment (Lt. Col Ant Betinakis) (656 personnel) 
 Greek 7th Regiment  (Col. E Cheretis) (877 personnel)
 Greek Garrison Battalion (commander unknown; ex-Greek 5th "Crete" Division, left behind as a garrison when their division was summoned to defend the mainland) 830 personnel)

19th Australian Infantry Brigade

Mobile Base Defence Organization 
Headquarters Mobile Base Defence Organization - Maj.-Gen. CE Weston-Souda Bay
 15th Coast Regiment, RA
 "S" Royal Marine Composite Battalion, Maj. R Garrett (Royal Marines)
 1st Battalion, The Rangers, The King's Royal Rifle Corps - (later designated 9th Battalion, The King's Royal Rifle Corps (The Rangers))
 102nd (Northumberland Hussars) Anti-Tank Regiment, Royal Artillery - no equipment, used as infantry
 106th (Lancashire Hussars) Light Anti-Aircraft Regiment, Royal Artillery - Lt. Col. AF Hely
 16th Australian Brigade Composite Battalion - 350 officers and menFormed from the under strength 2/2nd and 2/3rd Australian Infantry Battalions
 17th Australian Brigade Composite Battalion - 270 officers and menFormed from the understrength 2/5th and 2/6th Australian Infantry Battalions
 2nd Greek Regiment - 930 Officers and Men
 2nd Heavy Anti-Aircraft Regiment, Royal Marines

Naval forces 
 Commander-in-Chief, Mediterranean Fleet - Admiral Sir Andrew B Cunningham

Forces A1 
Force A1 - Rear Admiral H B Rawlings (R.A., 7th Cruiser Squadron)
 Queen Elizabeth-class battleships
 HMS Warspite (03) - Captain DB Fisher - damaged
 HMS Valiant (02) - Capt. CE Morgan - damaged
 G and H-class destroyers
  - Cmdr. WR Marshall-A'Deane, Sunk 22 May 1941
  - Lt. KRC Letts
  - Lt. GRG Watkins
  - Cmdr. HW Briggs
 J-class destroyer
  - Lt. Cmdr. JFW Hine

Force B 
Force B - Capt. Henry A Rowley
 Light cruisers
 HMS Gloucester (62) - Capt. Henry A Rowley, sunk 22 May 1941 with the loss of 722 crew
 HMS Fiji (58) - Capt. PBRW William-Powlett, sunk 22 May 1941
 HMS Orion (85) - Capt. GRB Back - damaged
 HMS Dido (37) - Capt. HWV McCall - damaged
 Destroyers
 HMS Decoy (H75) - Cmdr. EG McGregor
 HMS Hereward (H93) - Lt. WJ Munn, sunk by enemy aircraft 29 May 1941.
 HMS Hotspur (H01) - Lt.Cmdr. CPF Brown
 HMS Imperial (D09) - Lt. Cmdr. CA De W Kitcat, sunk 29 May 1941 off Crete
 HMS Jackal (F22) - Lt. Cmdr. MP Jonas
 HMS Kimberley (F50) - Lt. Cmdr. JSM Richardson

Force C

Force D

Force E 
Force E - Captain JP Mack (CO 14th Destroyer Flotilla)
  - Capt. (D2) H St L Nicholson
  - Capt. (D14) P J Mack
  - Lt. Cmdr. Max Joshua Clark
  - Capt. TC Hampton  - damaged

5th Destroyer Flotilla
5th Destroyer Flotilla - Captain Mountbatten
 HMS Kelly (F01) - Capt. Lord Louis Mountbatten, Sunk 23 May 1941
 HMS Kashmir (F12) - Cmdr. HA King, Sunk 23 May 1941
 HMS Kelvin (F37) - Cmdr. JH Alison - damaged
 HMS Jackal (F22) - Lt.Cmdr. MP Jonas
 HMS Kipling (F91) - Cmdr. A St Clair-Ford

Evacuation Fleet

Sphakia evacuation force - Rear-Admiral King
 HMS Phoebe - Capt. G Grantham, light cruiser
 HMAS Perth - Capt. Sir P.W. Bowyer-Smith, light cruiser - damaged
 HMS Coventry - Capt. WP Carne, light cruiser
 HMS Calcutta - Capt. DM Lees, Anti-aircraft cruiser, sunk 1 June 1941 with 255 survivors
 HMS Glengyle - Capt. CH Petrie, Landing Ship, Infantry (Large)
 HMAS Napier (G97) - Capt. Stephen Harry Tolson Arliss RN, N-class Flotilla Leader.
 HMAS Nizam (G38) - Lt. Cmdr. Max Joshua Clark
 HMS Kelvin (F37) - Cmdr. JH Alison
 HMS Kandahar (F28) - Cmdr. WGA Robson

Air forces 
 Air Officer Commander-in-Chief, Middle East - Air Chief Marshal Sir Arthur Longmore
 No. 30 Squadron RAF (Squadron Leader RA Milward/Sqn. Ldr. Shannon) - Bristol Blenheim
 No. 33 Squadron RAF (Sqn. Ldr. MT StJ Prattle/Sqn.Ldr. Edward Howell, OBE, DFC) - Gloster Gladiator, Hawker Hurricane
 No. 80 Squadron RAF (Sqn. Ldr. EG Jones) - Gloster Gladiator, Hawker Hurricane
 No. 112 Squadron RAF (Sqn. Ldr. LG Schwab) - Gloster Gladiator, Hawker Hurricane
 No. 203 Squadron RAF - Bristol Blenheim

Axis forces

Land, Airborne and Air forces

Fliegerkorps XI

Fliegerkorps VIII

Luftflotte IV

Luftlande Sturmregiment

Two glider companies were detached and seconded to 7th Flieger Division, below

7th Flieger Division 

The 2nd Battalion of the 2nd FJ Rgt was used with the 1st FJ Rgt

5th Gebirgs Division

See also 
 Battle of Crete
 List of orders of battle

Notes

References

Sources

External links
 Crete Order of Battle
 Battle of Crete Naval Order of Battles
 Order of Battle Site - Battle of Crete
 Matilda Tanks at Retimo on the Island of Crete

Crete
Order of Battle